The 1996 USISL Professional League was the second highest of the three outdoor men's leagues run by the United Systems of Independent Soccer Leagues during the summer of 1996.

Overview
This season, the USISL introduced several changes.  First, the league added a third, higher league above the professional league.  Consequently, several 1995 Pro League teams moved up and did not compete in the 1996 Pro League.  Second, the USISL aligned its rules with the newly created Major Soccer League.  In previous seasons, the USISL had used 60 minute halves and a shootout for every foul committed after the seventh foul of each half.  Both of these were gone for the 1996 season.  The USISL also changed its regular season points system to match MLS.  This meant each win was worth 3 points and each shootout win was worth 1 point.  The average pay for Pro League players was $200 per week.  The regular season began in mid-April 1996.

Prime Network provided live broadcast of the USISL All Star Game and delayed broadcast of the Pro League championship game.

All Star Game
The USISL held its All Star Game on July 17 in Blaine, Minnesota.  The game pitted the USISL Select League All Stars against a team composed of USISL Professional League and USISL Premier League players.  The league coaches voted to select the players.  Players from the USISL Professional League included Goalkeeper Randy DeDini of the Chico Rooks, Defenders Paul Edwards (North Jersey Imperials) and Guy Norcott (Charleston Battery); Midfielders Craig Beeson (Everett BigFoot) and Pat O'Kelly (Central Jersey); Forwards Victor Medina (D/FW Toros) and Jon Payne (Charlotte Eagles).

Regular season
 Regulation win = 3 points
 Shootout win (SW) = 1 points
 Loss = 0 points

Northeast Conference

South Atlantic Conference

Central Conference

Western Conference

Playoffs
The Mobile Revelers made the playoffs despite having only eleven points.  This happened because the South Atlantic Conference had four guaranteed play-off spots.  The Charleston Battery received a bye into the playoffs as host of the championship final.  Therefore, the league went to the Revelers as the next South Atlantic Conference team in line.

Conference semifinals
 North Jersey Imperials 3-1 Rhode Island Stingrays
 Charlotte Eagles 1-0 Mobile Revelers (forfeit) 
 Wilmington Hammerheads 3-1 Washington Mustangs
 D/FW Toros 1-0 (SO) Houston Hurricanes
 Tulsa Roughnecks 3-2 (SO) Rockford Raptors
 Chico Rooks 3-0  Valley Golden Eagles
 Everete BigFoot 2-1 Hawaii Tsunami

Conference finals

Northeast Conference

 North Jersey Imperials advanced to Sizzlin' Six finals.

South Atlantic Conference

 Wilmington Hammerheads advanced to the Sizzlin' Six finals.

Central Conference

 Originally planned for August 17, the second game was postponed until Sunday morning, August 18, because of heavy rainfall and flooding which rendered the playing field unusable on Saturday.

 D/FW Toros advanced to the Sizzlin' Six finals.

Western Conference

 Chico Rooks advanced to Sizzlin' Six finals.

Sizzlin' Six Tournament
The Sizzlin’ Six Tournament was a six-team, two group, round robin tournament.  Each of the four conference champions entered the tournament, along with national finals host Charleston Battery and the Charlotte Eagles who had the best regular-season record among the conference runners-up.

Each team received 3 points for a win, 1 for a tie and 1 bonus point for each game in which they scored three or more goals.  The top two teams in each group with the most points advanced to the semifinals in Charleston, South Carolina.

Group A

Group B

Semifinals

Final

Points leaders

Honors
 MVP: Craig Beeson
 Points leader: Patrick Olalere
 Defender of the Year: Guy Norcott
 Goalkeeper of the Year: Chris Carmiento
 Rookie of the Year: Juan Sastoque
 Coach of the Year: Nuno Piteira
 Organization of the Year: Reading Rage

All-League: 
 Goalkeeper: Randy Dedini
 Defenders: Guy Norcott, Tom Finley, Desmond Armstrong
 Midfielders: David Price, Pat O'Kelly, Carlos Rocha
 Forward:  Craig Beeson, Patrick Olalere, Jimmy Wright, Philibert Jones

External links
United Soccer Leagues (RSSSF)
The Year in American Soccer - 1996

References

USL Second Division seasons
3